Niccolò Comneno Papadopoli (Nikólaos Komninós Papadópoulos; 6 January 1655 on Crete – 20 January 1740 in Padua) was an Italian lawyer and historian of Greek origin.

Life 
He was born to Zuanne (Giovanni) Papadopoli, a Venetian administrator at Candia, present day Heraklion.

Papadopoli studied Canon Law and became a librarian at the University of Padua. In 1726 he published on the history of the university.

That work contains gross inaccuracies (if not lies), for example regarding the life of Oliver Cromwell and Nicolaus Copernicus. Papadopoli had falsely claimed in 1726 that he had seen an entry of Copernicus in records of a "Polish nation" at the university. In the century that had passed since, this claim had been widely published and "found a place in all subsequent biographies of Copernicus, but the decorative particulars added by the historian of the Pavian university have been shown to be wholly incorrect" and utterly baseless as shown over 150 years by Carlo Malagola and Leopold Prowe.

Papadopoli's work was continued since 1739 by Jacopo Facciolati.

Literature 

 Von Moy de Sons, K. E., Vehring, Fr. H. : Archiv für Katholisches Kirchenrecht, Verlag Franz Kirchheim, Mainz1863 (Google Buchsuche)
 Christian Pletzing:„Deutsche Kultur" und „polnische Zivilisation" Geschichtsbilder in West- und Ostpreußen zwischen Vormärz und Kulturkampf, S. 189-204, in: Matthias Weber: Preussen in Ostmitteleuropa: Geschehensgeschichte und Verstehensgeschichte, Oldenbourg Wissenschaftsverlag, 2003, 
 Stefan Kirschner, Andreas Kühne: "Die Rezeption von Copernicus im Spiegel seiner Biographien"; in: Form, Zahl, Ordnung. Studien zur Wissenschaftsgeschichte. Festschrift für Ivo Schneider zum 65. Geburtstag; hrsg. v. Rudolf Seising, Menso Folkerts, Ulf Hashagen; Stuttgart (Steiner) 2004 (Boethius, Bd. 48), S. 467-479 (Google Buchsuche)

External links 
 Works, in Opac of Servizio Bibliotecario Nazionale
 '’Prænotiones mystagogicæ ex jure canonico’’, National library at Florence

1655 births
1740 deaths
18th-century Italian historians
Writers from Heraklion
17th-century Italian jurists
18th-century Italian jurists
Venetian Greeks
Kingdom of Candia
Italian people of Greek descent
Converts to Roman Catholicism from Eastern Orthodoxy
Greek Roman Catholics
Academic staff of the University of Padua